The 1983 All-Ireland Minor Football Championship was the 52nd staging of the All-Ireland Minor Football Championship, the Gaelic Athletic Association's premier inter-county Gaelic football tournament for boys under the age of 18.

Dublin entered the championship as defending champions, however, they were defeated in the Leinster Championship.

On 18 September 1983, Derry won the championship following an 0-8 to 1-3 defeat of Cork in the All-Ireland final. This was their second All-Ireland title overall and their first in 18 championship seasons.

Results

Connacht Minor Football Championship

Quarter-Final

Semi-Finals

Final

Munster Minor Football Championship

Quarter-Finals

Semi-Finals

Final

Leinster Minor Football Championship

Preliminary Round

Quarter-Finals

Semi-Finals

Final

Ulster Minor Football Championship

Preliminary Round

Quarter-Finals

Semi-Finals

Final

All-Ireland Minor Football Championship

Semi-Finals

Final

References

1983
All-Ireland Minor Football Championship